The station Bry-sur-Marne is an RER station in the Paris suburb Bry-sur-Marne (in the Val-de-Marne department).

The station
The station is named for the town in which it is located, in the eastern suburbs of Paris. It comprises two tracks – one going towards Paris, the other towards Marne-la-Vallée and Disneyland Paris. The station contains a help desk, an automated ticket-vending machine, and a baker's shop. The tracks are on an elevated level; lifts provide access for wheelchair users.

The station is on the very edge of Bry-sur-Marne, close to the town of Noisy-le-Grand, thus making it also the closest available station for residents in parts of that town.

, the estimated annual attendance by the RATP Group was 2,450,013 passengers.

RER A
On the A line, Bry-sur-Marne is located on branch A4, leading to the Marne-la-Vallée station, and thus connecting Paris both to parts of the western suburbs and to Disneyland Paris (which is in fact well outside Paris).

As it is a fairly small town, Bry-sur-Marne is one station (along with neighbouring Neuilly-Plaisance) where trains do not systematically stop, in either direction. Complaints by residents, requesting systematic stops at the station, have become something of a local issue, acknowledged by the mayor.

Bus connections 

Gallery

References

Réseau Express Régional stations
Railway stations in France opened in 1977
Railway stations in Val-de-Marne